Ragnar Kvam Jr. (born 23 September 1942) is a Norwegian journalist, globetrotter, biographer and non-fiction writer. He was born in Kvinesdal and is a son of Ragnar Kvam. From 1974 to 1987 he was a journalist for the newspaper Dagbladet. He then initiated a period of sailing around the world, which eventually resulted in three books, Oppbrudd from 1990, Havet har meg nå from 1992, and En sjøreise til Sibir from 1996. He has written biographies of Hjalmar Johansen and other polar explorers, and his three-volume biography of Thor Heyerdahl earned him the Riksmålsforbundet's literary prize. He has also written a biography on painter and counterfeiter Knud Bull, who was deported from Great Britain to Australia in 1846.

References

1942 births
Living people
People from Kvinesdal
Norwegian journalists
Norwegian non-fiction writers
Norwegian biographers
Norwegian travel writers
Norwegian male writers
Male biographers
Male non-fiction writers